Karel may refer to:

People
 Karel (given name)
 Karel (surname)
 Charles Karel Bouley, talk radio personality known on air as Karel
 Christiaan Karel Appel, Dutch painter

Business
 Karel Electronics, a Turkish electronics manufacturer
 Grand Hotel Karel V, Dutch Hotel
Restaurant Karel 5, Dutch restaurant

Other
 1682 Karel, an asteroid
 Karel (programming language), an educational programming language

See also

 Karelians or Karels, a Baltic-Finnic ethnic group
Karel and I, 1942 Czech film
Karey (disambiguation)

ja:カール (人名)